Wahacotte or Wahakotte is a village in Sri Lanka. It is located within Matale District, Central Province.

St. Anthony's shrine at Wahakotte is one of the most sacred shrines for Catholics in Sri Lanka.

See also 
List of towns in Central Province, Sri Lanka

External links 

Populated places in Matale District